Leith Burghs was a district of burghs constituency of the House of Commons of the Parliament of the United Kingdom from 1832 to 1918. The constituency represented the parliamentary burghs of Leith, Musselburgh and Portobello.

In 1918 Leith was included in Leith, while Musselburgh and Portobello were merged into Edinburgh East.

Members of Parliament

Election results

See also

 District of burghs

References

Historic parliamentary constituencies in Scotland (Westminster)
Constituencies of the Parliament of the United Kingdom established in 1832
Constituencies of the Parliament of the United Kingdom disestablished in 1918